Granite Hills High School may refer to:
 Granite Hills High School (Apple Valley, California)
 Granite Hills High School (El Cajon, California)
 Granite Hills High School (Porterville, California)